An eyesore is something that is largely considered to look unpleasant or ugly. Its technical usage is as an alternative perspective to the notion of landmark. Common examples include dilapidated buildings, graffiti, litter, polluted areas, and excessive commercial signage such as billboards. Some eyesores may be a matter of opinion such as controversial modern architecture (see also spite house), transmission towers or wind turbines.  Natural eyesores include feces, mud and weeds.

Effect on property values
In the US, the National Association of Realtors says an eyesore can shave about 10 percent off the value of a nearby listing.

Remediation

Clean-up programmes to improve or remove eyesores are often started by local bodies or even national governments. These are frequently called Operation Eyesore. High-profile international events such as the Olympic Games usually trigger such activity.

Others contend that it is best to address these problems while they are small, since signs of neglect encourage anti-social behaviour such as vandalism and fly-tipping. This strategy is known as fixing broken windows.

Controversy

Whether some constructions are eyesores is a matter of opinion which may change over time. Landmarks are often called eyesores.

Examples of divided opinion

 Eiffel Tower – Upon its construction, Parisians wanted it torn down as an eyesore. In modern times it is one of the world's "top" landmarks.
 Golden Gate Bridge was controversial ahead of its construction, it being said in The Wasp that it "would prove an eye-sore to those now living  ... certainly mar if not utterly destroy the natural charm of the harbor famed throughout the world." It is now considered a notable landmark.
 Millennium Dome – the ugliest building in the world in a poll by the business magazine Forbes of "15 architects, all of whom were American apart from one who was British and one who was Canadian".
 Federation Square – despite being hailed a landmark by many, it has equally been rejected by many notable Australians as an eyesore.
 Wind farms – thought to be the worst eyesore by readers of Country Life but liked by others.
 Boston's Government Center, where City Hall has been called "The World's Ugliest Building".
 One Rincon Hill – Situated just south of San Francisco's Financial District, this high-rise condominium surrounded by shorter buildings has generated some mixed reviews.
 Lloyd's Building – Situated in the City of London, this building was described as an oil refinery when it was opened in 1986 for having most of its facilities, stairways and AC on the outside. Some people still say this, although the building has become more popular and liked in the recent years.
 Tour Montparnasse - a lone skyscraper in the Montparnasse area of Paris, France. Its appearance mars the Paris urban landscape, and construction of skyscrapers was banned in the city centre two years after its completion. A 2008 poll of editors on Virtualtourist voted the building the second ugliest building in the world. It is sometimes said that the view from the top is the most beautiful in Paris, because it is the only place from which the tower itself cannot be seen.
 Brisbane Transit Centre and Riverside Expressway – have been called eyesores and planning debacles by University of Queensland Associate Professor of Architecture Peter Skinner.
 Tricorn Centre in Portsmouth. Built in 1964, it was initially highly respected. It was described as a "mildewed lump of elephant droppings" by Prince Charles, and was subsequently demolished.

Structures that have been described as eyesores

 Spencer Street Power Station – an asbestos ridden landmark regarded by many as Melbourne's biggest eyesore. It was demolished in 2008.
 Cahill Expressway in Sydney – regarded by many as a major planning mistake.
 Sydney Harbour Control Tower – constructed in 1974 and demolished in 2016.
 Riverside Plaza in Minneapolis, Minnesota
 Embarcadero Freeway – Along The Embarcadero in San Francisco, this double-decker elevated freeway blocked The Embarcadero's view and shadowed the boulevard under it. When it was demolished in 1991, the long-abandoned Ferry Building and the boulevard under the freeway were restored.
 Petrobras Headquarters in Rio de Janeiro, Brazil, an example of concrete brutalism applied to an office building.
 The Hole In The Road in Sheffield, England, filled in during 1994.
 City-Center in Helsinki, colloquially known as Makkaratalo (Sausage House) because of the concrete sausage-like railing circling the third floor parking lot.
 Northampton Power Station, England. Left derelict since 1975, it was demolished circa 2015 to make way for the University of Northampton.
 House of Soviets, Kaliningrad, Russia. "The ugliest building on Russian soil".
 School of Architecture, Royal Institute of Technology, Stockholm, Sweden. Won an opinion poll for Stockholm's ugliest building, by broad majority. Damaged by a fire in 2011.
 Spire of Dublin in Dublin, Republic of Ireland
 American Dream Meadowlands. Most politicians and the public have equally criticized the building's appearance calling it "The ugliest building in New Jersey".
 Waldschlösschen Bridge in Dresden, Germany. The Dresden Elbe Valley lost the UNESCO World Heritage Site status because of this bridge.
 Barclays Center in Brooklyn, New York. Widely regarded as a jarring and aesthetically unappealing addition to the local landscape.
 Cebu City Hall, considered an eyesore by many during the early to mid 2000s, until it was renovated in 2007, and is now considered as one of the best city halls in the Philippines.
 Majesty Building in Altamonte Springs, Florida locally known as the I-4 Eyesore, a building that has been under construction since 2001.
 Torre de Manila, a high-rise development by DMCI Homes that dwarfs the Rizal Monument.
 The Viking Wind Farm which is under construction in the Tingwall Valley in Central Shetland.

See also

 Aesthetics
 Brownfield land
 Local ordinances
 NIMBY
 Redevelopment
 Spite fence
 Town planning
 Ugliness
 Urban blight
 Visual pollution

References

External links
 

Aesthetics
Urban planning
Pollution